Pininyahang hipon (lit. "shrimp with pineapples"), is a Filipino dish consisting of shrimp cooked in coconut milk, pineapples, tomatoes, onions, and various spices. It is a sweet variant of ginataang hipon (shrimp in coconut milk). It is commonly cooked with leftover shrimp from halabos na hipon dishes.

See also

 Ginataang hipon
 Halabos
 Pininyahang manok
 List of shrimp dishes

References

External links
 

Shrimp dishes
Philippine seafood dishes